Stephen IV may refer to:

Stephen IV, Greek Orthodox Patriarch of Antioch (died 744)
Pope Stephen III, aka Stephen IV, (720–772), native of Sicily
Pope Stephen IV, Pope from June 816 to January 817
Stephen IV of Hungary (c. 1133 – 1165), King of Hungary and Croatia
Stephen IV of Serbia (c. 1285  – 1331), King of Serbia
Stephen Ostojić of Bosnia (died 1421), King of Bosnia
Stephen IV of Moldavia (r. 1517–1527)